is a Japanese manga series written and illustrated by Wakō Honna. It was serialized on Shogakukan's online platform Sunday Webry from April 2017 to February 2019, with its chapters collected in nine tankōbon volumes.

Publication
Written and illustrated by Wakō Honna, Wakō Honna was serialized on Shogakukan's online platform Sunday Webry from April 5, 2017, to February 6, 2019. Shogakukan collected its chapters in nine tankōbon volumes, released from September 12, 2017, to May 10, 2019.

Volume list

See also
Nozoki Ana, another manga series by the same author
Nozo × Kimi, another manga series by the same author

References

Further reading

Fiction about photography
Japanese webcomics
Romance anime and manga
Seinen manga
Shogakukan manga
Webcomics in print